Star Jones is a talk show hosted by former prosecutor Star Jones. A guest-driven live broadcast (with taped segments) covering recent stories from the worlds of pop culture, entertainment, crime, and justice, it premiered on August 20, 2007 on Court TV. On January 31, 2008 TruTV announced the show would be canceled. The last episode aired on February 1, 2008.

The premiere included a discussion of the pros and cons of the CBS reality series Kid Nation and an interview with actor Isaiah Washington. Geraldo Rivera, Shaun Robinson of Access Hollywood, Dr. Marc Lamont Hill, and former CBS morning host Rene Syler were additional guests. Jones ended the program with an "open letter", a regular segment in which she addresses the audience with a closing statement a la Jerry Springer.

In his review in Variety, Brian Lowry described Jones as "utterly off-putting . . . delivering yet another reminder that Oprah Winfrey's skills aren’t easily cloned." He referred to her "scant facility for moderating but an unerring knack for uttering non sequiturs" and added, "It's possible, of course, that Jones and her team will gradually revise the formula to better suit her limitations, but at this point, what she cloyingly refers to as "the Star treatment" is, in reality, strictly a third-class affair . . . Jones appears poorly cast and will need a TV makeover to linger beyond Court's name switch to TruTV in January."

The one-hour program aired weekdays at 3:00pm ET/PT.

External links
Interview with Jones
Variety review

2007 American television series debuts
2008 American television series endings
TruTV original programming
2000s American television talk shows
English-language television shows